Ma Weiming (born 6 April 1960) is a Chinese electrical engineer. He is a professor of the PLA Naval University of Engineering. He is an academician of the Chinese Academy of Engineering and holds the military rank of rear admiral. He led the development of the electromagnetic catapult system for the Type 003 aircraft carrier and the development of electromagnetic railguns. In 2017, he was awarded the Order of August First, the highest honour of the People's Liberation Army.

Biography
Ma was born in April 1960 in Yangzhong, Jiangsu, China. He graduated from the Department of Electrical Engineering of PLA Naval University of Engineering in Wuhan with a BS degree in 1982 and an MS degree in 1987. He earned his Ph.D. in electrical engineering from Tsinghua University in 1996.

Ma is Professor and Director of the Institute of Power Electronic Technique Application at the Naval University of Engineering. In 2001, he was elected a member of the Chinese Academy of Engineering (CAE) at the age of 41, making him the youngest academician of the CAE. He also serves as Vice President of the China Association for Science and Technology. Considered a top naval engineer in China, he holds the military rank of rear admiral.

Ma was elected an alternate member of the 18th Central Committee of the Communist Party of China in 2012 and the 19th Central Committee in 2017. In November 2019, he was promoted to full member at the Fourth Plenum of the 19th Central Committee.

Contributions 
Ma has led the development of China's electromagnetic catapult system for launching aircraft from carriers (similar to the Electromagnetic Aircraft Launch System of the United States), which is more efficient than the older steam catapult system. It is expected to be deployed on the Type 003, the PLA Navy's third aircraft carrier, which would make China the second country to develop the technology, after the US.

In January 2019, Chinese media reported that Ma's team had developed electromagnetic railguns capable of firing projectiles at very high velocity, with longer range and higher accuracy than traditional artillery. Military observers expect a modified version of the Type 055 destroyer to be equipped with the railgun, which would make China the first country to deploy the weapon on an actual warship.

Ma is also credited for silencing noise of the PLA Navy's submarine's propulsion system thus making them less detectable on sonar.

Since the late 1980s, Ma has advised more than 400 masters and doctoral students. Two of them, Xiao Fei and Wang Dong, were awarded rare peacetime First-Class Merit Awards by the PLA for their research.

Honours
Two State Technological Invention Awards (Third Class)
State Science and Technology Progress Award (First Class), 2000
Ho Leung Ho Lee Prize in Technological Sciences, 2015
Order of August First, 2017

References

1960 births
Living people
20th-century Chinese engineers
21st-century Chinese engineers
Alternate members of the 18th Central Committee of the Chinese Communist Party
Alternate members of the 19th Central Committee of the Chinese Communist Party
Chinese electrical engineers
Engineers from Jiangsu
Members of the Chinese Academy of Engineering
Members of the 19th Central Committee of the Chinese Communist Party
People's Liberation Army generals from Jiangsu
People's Liberation Army Navy admirals
Scientists from Yangzhou
Tsinghua University alumni